Ariel Misick   (born 1951) is a Turks and Caicos Islands politician and former minister of development and commerce. He served on a four-member interim Advisory Council from July 1986 to 3 March 1988 after two previous Chief Ministers were forced to resign and ministerial government in the territory was suspended. He is now a partner at the law firm of Misick & Stanbrook. Misick was a member of the National Democratic Alliance.

Ariel practices in Civil and Commercial Litigation and Constitutional Law and also in the area of Trusts Law, Banking, and Corporate and Commercial.

He founded the firm in 1981. Ariel is the most senior advocate in the Turks and Caicos Islands and has extensive experience in Turks and Caicos and also in England appearing as an advocate in various appeals before the Privy Council.

Ministerial government resumed after elections were held in early 1988.

References

1951 births
Living people
Officers of the Order of the British Empire
Turks and Caicos Islands lawyers
Turks and Caicos Islands politicians